Ismael Alberto Quílez (born 2 October 1988 in Santa Fe) is an Argentine football defender who plays for Huracán of the Argentine Primera División in Argentina.

Career
Quílez came through the Colón youth development system to make his competitive debut for the first team in a 0-1 defeat to Estudiantes on 7 December 2008 aged 20. In the Apertura 2009 Quílez became a regular player for the team, starting the majority of the games.

External links
 
 
 
 

1988 births
Living people
Footballers from Santa Fe, Argentina
Argentine footballers
Association football defenders
Argentine Primera División players
Primera Nacional players
Club Atlético Colón footballers
Quilmes Atlético Club footballers
Racing Club de Avellaneda footballers
Aldosivi footballers
Central Córdoba de Santiago del Estero footballers
Club Atlético Huracán footballers
Argentina international footballers